Ngāti Rānana is a Māori cultural group based in London, the capital of the United Kingdom. It is open to the Māori community in the city, and hosts events attended by many non-Māori. The club aims to provide "an environment to teach, learn and participate in Māori culture and to promote New Zealand through Māori culture". Its performing arts group regularly performs throughout the UK and the rest of Europe.

History
In 1959 the group was founded by a small group of London-based New Zealanders as the London Māori Club.

Founding member Esther Jessop was awarded the Queen's Service Medal for community service in the 1994 New Year Honours. She was named New Zealander of the Year in Britain for 2009, and in the 2021 Queen's Birthday Honours she was appointed an Officer of the New Zealand Order of Merit, for services to Māori and to New Zealand–British relations.

Since 2005 the New Zealand Studies Association has issued the "Rahera Windsor Award for New Zealand Studies", in honour of another of Ngāti Rānana's founding members, Rahera Windsor.

See also
 Māori in the United Kingdom

References

External links
 Ngāti Rānana website
 Ngāti Rānana Facebook Group
 Hinemihi on the National Trust website

British people of Māori descent
Culture in London
Māori diaspora
Māori organisations
New Zealand expatriates in the United Kingdom
Urban Māori
New Zealand diaspora in Europe